The Lockheed Model 9 Orion is a single-engined passenger aircraft built in 1931 for commercial airlines. It was faster than any American military aircraft of that time. Designed by Richard A. von Hake, it was the last wood aircraft produced by the Lockheed Aircraft Corporation.

Design
The Orion was the last design using many identical elements from the Lockheed designs preceding it. It primarily used all the elements of the Altair, but included a forward top cockpit similar to the Vega, plus the NACA cowling introduced in the Air Express. Lockheed used the same basic fuselage mold and wing for all these wooden designs (the Explorer wing was unique), hence the close similarities between them. The Orion featured an enclosed cabin with seating for six passengers. The Orion received its Approved Type Certificate on 6 May 1931.

Gerard F. Vultee was Lockheed's chief engineer in 1928 through 1931 and was involved in the designs of all the Lockheed variants of that time and specifically designed Charles Lindbergh's Sirius.

Operational history
Although designed with the passenger market in mind, its speed made it a natural for air races. The first Bendix race of 1931 had a showing of two Orions, three Altairs and one Vega in a race that had only nine aircraft competing. On 11 July 1935, Laura H. Ingalls flew a Lockheed Orion, powered by a Pratt & Whitney Wasp engine, from Floyd Bennett Field to Burbank, California, establishing an East-West record for women. Two months later she flew it back to set a West-East record.

Northwest Airways, later renamed to Northwest Airlines, operated the plane from 1933 to 1935. American Airways, itself also renamed to American Airlines in 1934, operated several 9D Orions. Many safe miles were flown in airline service and the headlines won by a few expert speed pilots proved the advanced design and reliability of the Orion. Those that went into airline use as a passenger transport had their lifespan limited, however. In 1934, the Civil Aeronautics Authority issued a ruling prohibiting further use of single-engined passenger aircraft from operating on all major networks. It also became mandatory to have a copilot and therefore a two-seat cockpit arrangement on all such flights. The requirements of the ruling brought an end to the "Orion" as a passenger-carrying airlines airplane. They were then used for cargo or mail carrying or sold for private use and charter. Because the aircraft had a complicated wood construction and needed to be sent back to Lockheed in Burbank California to be repaired, they were often disposed of after any type of significant accident. At least 12 of the used "Orions" were purchased for service in the Spanish Civil War and destroyed in use.

In 1935, a single Model 9 Orion was modified by Lockheed as a news camera plane for the Detroit News. To work in the role, a pod was built into the front leading edge of the right wing about eight feet out from the fuselage.  This pod had a glass dome on the front and mounted a camera. To aim the camera the pilot was provided with a primitive grid similar to a gunsight on his windshield.

The Orion Explorer was a modified 9E. It had a damaged wing replaced with the wing of the Explorer 7 after a crash, and was fitted with a  Pratt & Whitney Wasp S3H1 engine. Fixed landing gear and later floats were also fitted.

Variants

Orion 9 14 built,  Pratt & Whitney Wasp A or  Pratt & Whitney Wasp C
Orion 9A Special one aircraft with  Pratt & Whitney Wasp SC engine
Orion 9B two aircraft supplied to Swissair,  Wright R-1820-E engine
Orion 9C redesignated Altair DL-2A
Orion 9D 13 built
Orion 9E three aircraft with  Pratt & Whitney Wasp SC-1 engine
Orion 9F one executive aircraft with a  Wright R-1820-F2 engine
Orion 9F-1 one executive aircraft with a  Wright R-1820-F2 engine
UC-85 one Orion 9D to USAAF in June 1942
Orion-Explorer modified Orion 9E,  Pratt & Whitney Wasp S3H1 engine

Surviving aircraft

It is not known if any survived past the 1940s except the one that survives to the present day. This lone remaining Orion was originally built as an experimental Altair with a metal fuselage. This Altair (built in 1931) was damaged in a belly landing accident in Columbus, Ohio, in 1933. It was returned to Lockheed where it was converted in 1934 to an Orion 9C configuration by the original designer of the Orion, Richard A. von Hake, and others who worked for free during a slow period when the Lockheed factory was going into bankruptcy.

It was sold to Shell Aviation Corp., painted yellow-orange and red and named "Shellightning." It was used by Shell's aviation manager, James H. Doolittle, on cross-county and exhibition flights. Jimmy Doolittle made hundreds of trips in this Lockheed, and the aircraft  was very much in evidence at air shows, airport dedications, and business meetings across the territories of all three Shell companies in the United States.

In 1936, "Shellightning" was again involved in an accident, in St. Louis, and was stored there. Two years later, Paul Mantz caught the racing bug in addition to his aeronautical movie work. He bought the damaged "Shellightning" and had it rebuilt at Parks Air College in St. Louis, Missouri with a more powerful Wright Cyclone engine and some streamlining to add to its speed. It was repainted red with white trim and Mantz flew the plane in the Bendix Races in 1938 and 1939, coming in third both times. In 1943, he sold the plane and it went through a series of owners until Mantz bought it back in 1955. He retained ownership until selling it to TallMantz Aviation, Inc. in 1962.

In 1964, the plane was sitting out in the open on the flightline at Orange County Airport, now John Wayne Airport, in blue-and-white American Airways trim. Some time in the 1960s it was purchased by Swiss Air and rebuilt to flying status by the famous "Fokker" restoration team and is on display at the Swiss Transport Museum in Lucerne, Switzerland in the livery of the original Swiss Air Orion.

Operators

 Lineas Aereas Occidentales

 Swissair

 Spanish Republican Air Force from LAPE, two from Swissair in 1935/1936.

 Alaska Star Airlines
 American Airways
 Air Express
 Bowen Air Lines
 Detroit News
 Hal Roach Studios
 Northwest Airways
 Paul Mantz 
 Transcontinental and Western Air/TWA
 United States Army Air Forces
 Shell Oil
 Varney Speed Lines
 Wyoming Air Service

Specifications (Orion 9D)

See also

Notes

Further reading

External links

 

1930s United States airliners
Aircraft first flown in 1931
Orion
Low-wing aircraft
Single-engined tractor aircraft